Nunu may refer to:

People
 Jemma Nunu Kumba (born 1966), South Sudanese politician
 Nunu Abashydze (born 1955), Ukrainian shot putter
 Nunu Datau, Indonesian actress
 Nunu Khumalo (born 1992), South African actress and model
 Nunù Sanchioni, Italian operatic singer
 Thamsanqa Keith Nunu (born 1998), Zimbabwean cricket player
 Nunu (born 1998), Israeli singer and performer

Places
 Ñuñu Qullu (disambiguation), name of several mountains in Bolivia
 San Vicente Nuñú, Mexico
 Nunu Kumba, Ethiopia

Other
 Nunu language
 Nunu, from League of Legends
 Nu-nu, herbal stimulant
 Nunu dialect of Ngiri language